Riofrío may refer to:

Colombia
Riofrío, Valle del Cauca, a municipality in the department of Valle del Cauca

Spain

Riofrío, Granada, a village in Loja, Andalusia
Riofrío, Ávila, a municipality in Ávila, Castile and León
Linares de Riofrío, a municipality in Salamanca, Castile and León
Navas de Riofrío, a municipality in Segovia, Castile and León
Riofrío de Riaza, a municipality in Segovia, Castile and León
Riofrío de Aliste, a municipality in Zamora, Castile and León
Riofrío del Llano, a municipality in Guadalajara, Castile-La Mancha
Vallejera de Riofrío, a municipality in Salamanca, Castile and León
Royal Palace of Riofrío, a royal palace in San Ildefonso, Segovia, Castile and León

See also
 Rio Frio (disambiguation)